The 2020–21 season was Al-Nassr's 45th consecutive season in the top flight of Saudi football and 65th year in existence as a football club. The club participated in the Pro League, the King Cup, and the AFC Champions League.

The season covered the period from 3 October 2020 to 30 June 2021.

Players

Squad information

Out on loan

Transfers and loans

Transfers in

Loans in

Transfers out

Loans out

Competitions

Overview

Goalscorers

Last Updated: 30 May 2021

Assists

Last Updated: 20 May 2021

Clean sheets

Last Updated: 14 May 2021

References

Al Nassr FC seasons
Nassr